Zappone is a surname. Notable people with the surname include:

 Katherine Zappone (born 1953), American-born Irish politician 
 Mary Zappone (born 1964), American businesswoman
 Tony Zappone (born 1947), American journalist
 Veronica Zappone (born 1993), Italian curler

Other uses
 Zappone v. Revenue Commissioners, Irish LGBT rights case